Carl James Schutz (born August 22, 1971) is a former Major League Baseball pitcher. He played one season with the Atlanta Braves in 1996 for the month of September.

References

External links

1936 births
Atlanta Braves players
Major League Baseball pitchers
Living people
Baseball players from Louisiana
Danville Braves players
Greenville Braves players
Durham Bulls players
Richmond Braves players
West Tennessee Diamond Jaxx players
Southeastern Louisiana Lions baseball players